Out Standing in Their Field is the eleventh studio album by the guitarist Steve Morse, released on September 29, 2009, by Eagle Rock Entertainment.

Track listing

Personnel
Steve Morse – guitar, production
Kevin Morse – guitar (track 7)
Van Romaine – drums, percussion, production
Dave LaRue – bass, production
Tim Conklin – engineering, mixing
Martin Pullan – mastering

References

Steve Morse albums
2009 albums
Eagle Rock Records albums